Shrestha Bangali is a 2017 Indian Bengali language dramedy film based on a novel by Shaktipada Rajguru and directed by Swapan Saha and starring Supratim Ghosh, Ulka Gupta, Laboni Sarkar, Rajpal Yadav, Shakti Kapoor and Rajatabha Dutta in important roles.

Plot 
The story is about the inhabitants of Chitmahal, a land near the Indo-Bangladesh border, they are neglected by the government, Kesto Master (Rajpal Yadav) who lives in the village tries to better their plight how he does it is the rest of the story.

Cast 

 Ulka Gupta
 Laboni Sarkar
 Shakti Kapoor
 Kaushik Banerjee
 Sumit Ganguly
 Rajatabha Dutta
 Rajpal Yadav
 Sunny Leone as item girl in song "Chaap Nishna"
 Supratim Ghosh

Soundtrack 
The music was composed by Monty Sharma, Anjjan Bhattacharya, Sanjeev-Darshan and released by Zee Music Company.

Critical reception 
The film is panned by critics for its weak script and so hilarious performance by the entire cast.

Release 
The film was released on 22 September 2017.

References

External links
 

2017 films
Bengali-language Indian films
2010s Bengali-language films
2017 masala films
Films directed by Swapan Saha
Films scored by Anjjan Bhattacharya
Films based on Indian novels